Janez Zavrl is a Slovenian association football coach. During his career he has coached Slovenian clubs, including NK Maribor and NK Celje. As a head coach of Celje he led the team towards the finals of the 1994–95 Slovenian Football Cup where Celje was defeated 2–1 aggregate against NK Mura.

References

Living people
Footballers from Ljubljana
NK Celje managers
NK Ljubljana managers
NK Maribor managers
Slovenian football managers
Year of birth missing (living people)